Dinamo–Rijeka derby is the name given to matches between Dinamo Zagreb and Rijeka. The teams are supported by their fanbases called Zagreb's Bad Blue Boys and Rijeka's Armada.

Games of note are the 1993–94 Croatian Football Cup final when Dinamo won the trophy and the 2013–14 Croatian Cup, 2016–17 Croatian Football Cup, 2018–19 Croatian Football Cup finals when Rijeka won. Dinamo has been by far the more successful side, which is evident in several long winning streaks through the history of the derby. However, Rijeka remained unbeaten in 23 consecutive home league fixtures from August 1964 until May 1994. While player movement between the two clubs has always taken place, it intensified since the mid-1980s, when Dinamo started acquiring many of Rijeka's best players. This trend had abated over the past decade.

Due to various formats that were used in the Croatian championship and the cup competition format (which has teams playing two-legged fixtures even in the final game) and in addition to the games played in the Supercup, there has been anywhere from two to six derbies per season. For example, as many as six derbies have been played between April and November 2004. Due to Rijeka's absence from the Yugoslav First League no derbies were played between 1947 and 1958, and between 1969 and 1974.

Results

By competition

Last updated on 13 November 2022.

By ground

Last updated on 13 November 2022.

List of matches

Key

1946–1991

1992–present

Top scorers
This is the list of top scoring players in the derby. Data updated up to the last derby played on 13 November 2022.

14 goals
 El Arabi Hillel Soudani

13 goals
 Mislav Oršić
 Slaven Zambata

9 goals
 Igor Cvitanović

7 goals
 Boško Balaban
 Snješko Cerin
 Damir Desnica
 Eduardo da Silva
 Zlatko Kranjčar
 Stjepan Lamza
 Dario Zahora

6 goals
 Mario Gavranović

5 goals
 Željko Adžić
 Duje Čop
 Željko Matuš
 Tomo Šokota

Players who have scored in Dinamo–Rijeka derby for both clubs
Boško Balaban (7 goals, 3 for Dinamo and 4 for Rijeka)
Mario Gavranović (6 goals, 3 for Dinamo and 3 for Rijeka)
Andrej Kramarić (3 goals, 1 for Dinamo and 2 for Rijeka)
Domagoj Pavičić (2 goals, 1 for Dinamo and 1 for Rijeka)
Renato Pilipović (2 goals, 1 for Dinamo and 1 for Rijeka)
Davor Vugrinec (2 goals, 1 for Dinamo and 1 for Rijeka)

Players who have played for both clubs (senior career)

Jasmin Agić
Mehmed Alispahić
Franko Andrijašević
Boško Balaban
Miroslav Blažević
Jozo Bogdanović
Ivan Boras
Eddy Bosnar
Ivan Bošnjak
Josip Brezovec
Marijan Brnčić
Marijan Buljat
Luka Capan
Ivica Car
Mladen Cukon
Mate Dragičević
Josip Drmić
Dino Drpić
Celestin Gašparini
Mario Gavranović
Sejad Halilović
Matej Jelić
Dario Jertec

Fabijan Komljenović
Andrej Kramarić
Ivan Krstanović
Sandro Kulenović
Stjepan Lamza
Marin Leovac
Marko Lešković
Rúben Lima
Nebojša Malbaša
Mate Maleš
Petar Mamić
Luka Menalo
Andre Mijatović
Mihael Mikić
Damir Milinović
Josip Mišić
Dumitru Mitu
Mladen Mladenović
Mislav Oršić
Stojan Osojnak
Zvonko Pamić
Domagoj Pavičić
Dubravko Pavličić

Saša Peršon
Renato Pilipović
Nikola Pokrivač
Josip Ražić
Stefan Ristovski
Elvis Scoria
Ilija Sivonjić
Dario Smoje
Miro Stipić
Fulvio Superina
Ivica Šangulin
Daniel Šarić
Fuad Šašivarević
Zoran Škerjanc
Hrvoje Štrok
Josip Tadić
Mario Tokić
Ivan Tomečak
Davor Vugrinec
Zoran Zekić

Managers who have worked at both clubs
Miroslav Blažević
Nenad Gračan
Branko Ivanković
Zlatko Kranjčar
Josip Kuže
Josip Skoblar

Yugoslav First League results

The table lists the place each team took in each of the seasons they played together in the top division.

Prva HNL results

The tables list the place each team took in each of the seasons.

See also
Eternal derby
Adriatic derby 
Osijek Rijeka derby

References

External links
Archive of Dinamo's games at povijestdinama.com  
History of Rijeka's participation in championships at NK-Rijeka.hr  

GNK Dinamo Zagreb
Football derbies in Croatia
derby